A thought leader is an individual or firm that is recognized as an authority in a specialized field.

Thought leader may also refer to:

 Thought Leader, a South African news website
 Thought leader (web) (or domain authority), describes the relevance of website for a specific subject area